Valeriy Chaly (birth: July 1, 1970, Vinnytsia, Ukraine) is a Ukrainian diplomat. He was the Ambassador of Ukraine to the United States from 2015 to 2019.

Education 
Valeriy Chaly graduated from Vinnytsia State Pedagogical University, historical faculty (1992); Taras Shevchenko National University of Kyiv, Institute of international relations, faculty of international law, postgraduate course (1995).

Career 
From 1995 to 1997, he worked as a senior consultant, helper and reviewer Group to the President of Ukraine. From 1997 to 1999, he was the helper of deputy secretary of National Security and Defense Council of Ukraine.

From  2000 to 2006, he was an independent consultant in Committee on foreign affairs Verkhovna Rada of Ukraine. From  2006 to 2009, he was Deputy General Director of International Programs. From  2009 to 2010, he was the deputy Minister of Ukrainian foreign affairs.

From  2010 to 2014, he was deputy General Director of Ukraine. From 2014 to 2015, he was deputy head of the Presidential Administration of Ukraine. From July 10, 2015, to July 19, 2019, he was the ambassador of Ukraine to the United States.

Diplomatic rank 
He holds the diplomatic rank of extraordinary and plenipotentiary ambassador (2014).

See also
 Embassy of Ukraine, Washington, D.C.

References

External links
 Coming weeks to be significant in regard to resolving conflict in east - Ukrainian presidential administration
 Valeriy Chaly appointed deputy head of Ukraine's presidential administration
 Deputy Head of the Presidential Administration Valeriy Chaly paid a working visit to Washington, DC, the U.S. to hold a series of meetings with representatives of American governmental institutions and NGOs.
 Chaly to become next ambassador to U.S., reports say
 Valeriy Chaly: After March 16, Crimea can face dangerous situation

Living people
1970 births
People from Vinnytsia
Vinnytsia State Pedagogical University alumni
Taras Shevchenko National University of Kyiv, Institute of International Relations alumni
Ambassadors of Ukraine to the United States
Ambassadors of Ukraine to Antigua and Barbuda
Ukrainian political scientists